The Town Scandal is a 1923 American comedy film directed by King Baggot from a screenplay written by Hugh Hoffman. It was based on the novel The Chicken That Came Home to Roost by Frederic Arnold Kummer. The film stars Gladys Walton, Edward Hearn, Edward McWade, Charles Hill Mailes, William Welsh and Billy Franey. The film was released on April 16, 1923, by Universal Pictures.

Cast          
Gladys Walton as Jean Crosby
Edward Hearn as Toby Caswell 
Edward McWade as Avery Crawford
Charles Hill Mailes as Bill Ramsey
William Welsh as Samuel Grimes
Billy Franey as Lysander Sprowl 
Anna Dodge as Mrs. Crawford 
Virginia True Boardman as Mrs. Sprowl 
Rosa Gore as Effie Strong
Nadine Beresford as Mrs. Grimes
Louise Reming Barnes as Mrs. Ramsey
Margaret Morris as Trixie

References

External links
 

1923 films
1920s English-language films
Silent American comedy films
1923 comedy films
Universal Pictures films
Films directed by King Baggot
American silent feature films
American black-and-white films
1920s American films